The Valveless was an English automobile manufactured, after lengthy development, from 1908 until 1915 in Huddersfield, Yorkshire. The successor to the Ralph Lucas Valveless, the car marked the entry of the David Brown & Sons group into the manufacture of motors.  Its engine was a 20 or 25 hp duplex two-stroke model which was advertised as having "only six working parts"; these included two pistons, two connecting rods, and two crankshafts, which were geared together and counter-rotated. This is a type of engine configuration known as a split single since it is effectively a single cylinder split into two.

Models
 1908
20 hp 2-cylinder 133 x 140 = 3.891 litres
 1909-1911
25 hp 2-cylinder 133 x 140 = 3.891 litres
 1911-1915
15 hp 2-cylinder 112 x 127 = 2.503 litres
 1913
15 hp 2-cylinder 118 x 127 = 2.503 litres
 1913-1914
19.9 hp 2-cylinder 127 x 127 = 3.217 litres
 1915
19.9 hp 2-cylinder 127 x 133 = 3.546 litres
The cars with smaller engines had slightly shorter wheelbases and so were lighter.

See also
 List of car manufacturers of the United Kingdom

References 

 David Burgess Wise, The New Illustrated Encyclopedia of Automobiles.

External links 

Defunct motor vehicle manufacturers of England
Defunct companies based in Yorkshire
Vehicle manufacturing companies established in 1908
Vehicle manufacturing companies disestablished in 1915
1908 establishments in England
1915 disestablishments in England
British companies disestablished in 1915
British companies established in 1908